Di Mu (born ) is a Chinese female  track cyclist. She competed in the keirin event at the 2012 UCI Track Cycling World Championships.

References

External links
 Profile at cyclingarchives.com

1985 births
Living people
Chinese track cyclists
Chinese female cyclists
Place of birth missing (living people)